Aaron Peck may refer to:

 Aaron Peck (writer) (born 1979), Canadian writer and educator
 Aaron Peck (American football) (born 1994), American football tight end